Kadokawa may refer to:

Kadokawa Corporation, the holding company of the Kadokawa Group
Kadokawa Content Gate and Kadokawa Mobile, both former names for BookWalker
Kadokawa Future Publishing, a subsidiary of Kadokawa Corporation and  the publishing side of Kadokawa with its brand companies
Kadokawa Light Novel Expo, an event held yearly by Kadokawa Corporation, dedicated to news for their various light novel series.
Kadokawa Pictures, the film production branch, at various times called Kadokawa Daiei Motion Picture Co., Ltd., Kadokawa Herald Pictures, Inc. and Kadokawa Shoten Pictures, Inc.
Kadokawa Shoten, a publishing house, or its subsidiaries. Currently a brand company of Kadokawa Future Publishing
Genyoshi Kadokawa, founder of the Kadokawa Group 
, former president of Kadokawa Shoten, son of Genyoshi
, Japanese politician

Japanese-language surnames